Ksenija Balta (born 1 November 1986) is an Estonian long jumper, sprinter and heptathlete. She won the long jump at the 2009 European Indoor Championships in Athletics.

Career
Balta finished 14th in pentathlon at the 2005 European Indoor Championships and won the bronze medal in heptathlon at the 2005 European Junior Championships. She also competed in long jump and 100 metres at the 2006 European Championships and in long jump at the 2008 Summer Olympics. She won the gold medal at the 2009 European Indoor Championships with a 6.87 meter jump in the fourth round.

Balta's personal best score in heptathlon is 6,180 points, achieved in July 2006 in Arles; in long jump 6.87 meters, achieved in 2009 in Turin (indoor) and in 2010 in Tallinn (outdoor); in 100 metres 11.47, achieved in 2006 in Gothenburg; and in 200 metres 23.05 in 2006 in Arles. She holds national outdoor records in 100 metres, 200 metres and long jump. She also holds indoor national records in 50 metres, 60 m hurdles and long jump.

Her coach is Andrei Nazarov.

Major competition record

References

External links

1986 births
Belarusian emigrants to Estonia
Living people
Athletes from Minsk
Estonian heptathletes
Estonian female sprinters
Estonian female long jumpers
Estonian people of Belarusian descent
Athletes (track and field) at the 2008 Summer Olympics
Athletes (track and field) at the 2016 Summer Olympics
Olympic athletes of Estonia
Estonian sportswomen
World Athletics Championships athletes for Estonia
Athletes (track and field) at the 2020 Summer Olympics